Fimbria is a genus of marine bivalve molluscs in the family Lucinidae. Fimbria contains two living species, Fimbria fimbriata and Fimbria soverbii. Several other species are known from fossils.

References

Bivalve genera
Lucinidae